State Route 69 (SR 69) is a  state highway that extends from the southwestern to the northeastern parts of the U.S. state of Alabama. The southern terminus of the highway is at an intersection with SR 177 at Jackson. The northern terminus of the highway is at an intersection with US 431/SR 79 at Guntersville.

Route description

SR 69 has a rather irregular trajectory for much of its length. From its southern terminus at Jackson, the highway heads to the northwest as it travels through Clarke County. In the northern part of the county, the highway turns northeastward as it approaches Linden.

North of Linden, SR 69 assumes a general northward trajectory, traveling through Greensboro as it heads towards Tuscaloosa, the largest city through which the highway travels. At Tuscaloosa, SR 69 travels concurrently with Interstate 359 (I-359) north of the interchange of I-359 and I-20/I-59. I-359/SR 69 shares a wrong-way concurrency with US 11 as they head into downtown Tuscaloosa.

Interestingly,  SR 69 intersects US 43 four times.

North of Tuscaloosa and Northport, SR 69 continues northward as it heads towards Jasper. At Jasper, SR 69 and SR 5 share a wrong-way concurrency along the former route of US 78.

North of Jasper, SR 69 resumes its northeastward trajectory as it heads towards Cullman. South of Cullman, the highway has an interchange with I-65 and shares a  concurrency with the interstate highway. SR 69 is one of only two signed state highways that is concurrent with a stretch of interstate highway in Alabama. (SR 5, along with US 11, are concurrent with I-20/I-59 between West Blocton and Bessemer).

As SR 69 heads northward from Cullman, it continues its northeastward orientation. It passes through Arab before turning eastward as it approaches its terminus at Guntersville.

Major intersections

See also

References

069
Transportation in Clarke County, Alabama
Transportation in Marengo County, Alabama
Transportation in Hale County, Alabama
Transportation in Tuscaloosa County, Alabama
Transportation in Walker County, Alabama
Transportation in Cullman County, Alabama
Transportation in Marshall County, Alabama
Transportation in Tuscaloosa, Alabama